The initials INM may stand for:
Ireland's Independent News & Media
Mexico's Instituto Nacional de Migración
Iraq's al-Iraqiyya National Movement
 UK Institute of Naval Medicine